Yafa'a District is a district of the Lahij Governorate, Yemen. As of 2003, the district had a population of 75,014 inhabitants.

References

Districts of Lahij Governorate